Alaena unimaculosa is a butterfly in the family Lycaenidae. It is found in the Democratic Republic of the Congo (Lualaba), Tanzania and Zambia. The habitat consists of rocky areas in woodland and montane grassland.

Subspecies
Alaena unimaculosa unimaculosa (Democratic Republic of the Congo: Lualaba)
Alaena unimaculosa aurantiaca Butler, 1895 (Tanzania: south-west to the Tabora Region, northern Zambia)

References

Butterflies described in 1926
Alaena